Valvis is a Greek surname. Notable people with the surname include:

Dimitrios Valvis (1814–1886), Greek politician and Prime Minister
Jean Valvis (born 1954), Greek businessman
Zinovios Valvis (1800 1886), Greek politician and Prime Minister

Greek-language surnames